Ricinoides atewa is an arachnid of the Ricinoididae family. This species was discovered during a RAP in Ghana. The species resembles a mixture of a crab and a spider, with the reproductive organ on its two legs.

They feed on termites and ants.

References

Ricinulei
Animals described in 2008
Invertebrates of West Africa